This is a list of some organized crime figures within the underworld of the former Soviet Union.

See also
Criminal tattoos
Chechen mafia
Georgian mafia
List of mobsters by city
Russian oligarchs
Ukrainian oligarchs
List of criminal enterprises, gangs and syndicates
Russian mafia
Thief in law

References

 
 
 
 
 
Kazakhstani criminals
 
Latvian criminals
 
 
 
 
Organized crime-related lists